Claude Delangle (born 1957) is a French classical saxophonist. He has been teaching saxophone at the National Superior Conservatory of Music of Paris since 1988. He played in "Quatuor Adolphe Sax Paris" with Jacques Baguet, Bruno Totaro and Jean-Paul Fouchécourt. He was very implicated during the 1980s in developing the contemporary repertory of all the saxophone's family. His influences include Luciano Berio, Betsy Jolas and Japanese music.
He studied Saxophone with Serge Bichon at the conservatory of Lyon and Daniel Deffayet in Paris.

Discography 
 Musique française pour saxophone with Quatuor Adolphe Sax Paris, Odile Catelin-Delangle et Pierre-Yves Arteau (1986).
 Quatuor de Hugues Dufourt with ensemble Fa direction Dominique My (1996).
 THE HISTORIC SAXOPHONE CD BIS 1270
 A SAXOPHONE FOR A LADY CD BIS 1020 (dedicated to Elisa Hall of Boston).
 THE JAPANESE SAXOPHONE CD BIS 890
 Claude DEBUSSY CD ERATO 
Rhapsodie pour orchestre et saxophone
Orchestre Philharmonique de Monte-Carlo,
Direction : Armin Jordan.
 And more than ten others.

References

External links 
 http://www.sax-delangle.com/

French saxophonists
Male saxophonists
Living people
Classical saxophonists
1957 births
Musicians from Lyon
20th-century classical musicians
20th-century saxophonists
21st-century classical musicians
21st-century saxophonists
Academic staff of the Conservatoire de Paris
20th-century French male musicians
21st-century French male musicians